The Big Piney Creek Bridge is a historic bridge, carrying Arkansas Highway 123 across Big Piney Creek in Ozark-St. Francis National Forest, northeast of Hagarville, Arkansas. The trusses are mounted on concrete piers. The bridge was built in 1931, during a period of financial hardship, and was for economic reasons built with a single-lane  roadway.

The bridge was listed on the National Register of Historic Places in 1990.

See also
List of bridges documented by the Historic American Engineering Record in Arkansas
List of bridges on the National Register of Historic Places in Arkansas
National Register of Historic Places listings in Johnson County, Arkansas

References

External links

Historic American Engineering Record in Arkansas
Road bridges on the National Register of Historic Places in Arkansas
National Register of Historic Places in Johnson County, Arkansas
Bridges completed in 1931
Steel bridges in the United States
Warren truss bridges in the United States
1931 establishments in Arkansas
Ozark–St. Francis National Forest
Transportation in Johnson County, Arkansas
Arkansas River